Dale R. Dunbar (born October 14, 1961) is a retired American professional ice hockey defenseman who briefly played in the National Hockey League during the 1980s.

Playing career
Never drafted, Dunbar had a solid college career at Boston University, where he was a teammate of future NHL star John Cullen. At the conclusion of his collegiate career in 1985 he signed as a free agent with the Vancouver Canucks. He would spend two years in Vancouver's farm system, appearing in a single NHL game for the Canucks during the 1985–86 season.

Released by the Canucks in 1987, he signed as a free agent with his hometown Boston Bruins. He spent the next two seasons playing for the Maine Mariners, Boston's AHL affiliate, and received another one-game callup to the NHL during the 1988–89 season.

After being released by the Bruins, Dunbar moved to Europe, spending a year in Finland before moving to England, where he suffered a career-ending knee injury during the 1990–91 season.

Following his career, Dunbar moved into coaching, serving as head coach of the Erie Otters of the OHL from 1996–98, and as an assistant coach at the University of Massachusetts-Amherst from 1998–2000. , he works for the Orr Hockey Group and operates hockey and leadership camps for youth, and as of 2014, coaches for Winthrop High School.

Career statistics

References

External links

1961 births
Living people
American men's ice hockey defensemen
Boston Bruins players
Boston University Terriers men's ice hockey players
Erie Otters coaches
Fredericton Express players
Ice hockey coaches from Massachusetts
Maine Mariners players
People from Winthrop, Massachusetts
Peoria Rivermen (IHL) players
Undrafted National Hockey League players
Vancouver Canucks players
Vaasan Sport players
Ice hockey players from Massachusetts